The 2010–11 Rio Grande Valley Killer Bees season was the eighth season of the CHL franchise in Hidalgo, Texas.

Regular season

Conference standings

Awards and records

Awards

Milestones

Transactions
The Killer Bees have been involved in the following transactions during the 2010–11 season.

Trades

Roster

See also
 2010–11 CHL season

References

External links
 2010–11 Rio Grande Valley Killer Bees season at Pointstreak

R
R